Michael Sullivan (or variants) may refer to:

Politicians
Michael Sullivan (U.S. Attorney) (born 1954), former Boston-based federal prosecutor and acting ATF Director
Michael Sullivan (Canadian senator) (1838–1915), Canadian senator
Michael Sullivan (MP) (1809–1878), UK MP for the Irish constituency of Kilkenny, 1847–1865
Michael D. Sullivan (judge) (1938–2000), justice of the Supreme Court of Mississippi
Michael J. Sullivan (mayor) (born 1956), mayor of Lawrence, MA
Michael J. Sullivan (Wyoming politician) (born 1943), Wyoming Labor Commissioner
Michael A. Sullivan (born 1959), former mayor of Cambridge, MA
Michael Quinn Sullivan (born 1970), president of Empower Texans and Texans for Fiscal Responsibility
Michael S. Sullivan (1876–1929), Newfoundland politician
Mike Sullivan (Wyoming politician) (born 1939), 29th Governor of Wyoming and former U.S. Ambassador to Ireland
Mike Sullivan (Canadian politician) (born 1952), Canadian Member of Parliament

Sportsmen
Michael Sullivan (rugby league) (born 1980), Australian rugby league footballer
Michael Sullivan (sport shooter) (born 1942), British sport shooter
Mike Sullivan (American football coach) (born 1967), American football coach (New York Giants)
Mike Sullivan (golfer) (born 1955), winner of the 1994 B.C. Open
Mike Sullivan (handballer) (born 1963), American Olympic handballer
Mike Sullivan (ice hockey) (born 1968), American ice hockey coach and former National Hockey League player
Mike Sullivan (offensive lineman) (born 1967), American football coach and former player 
Mike Sullivan (outfielder) (1860–1929), Major League Baseball player
Mike Sullivan (pitcher) (1866–1906), Major League Baseball pitcher
Mike Sullivan (wrestler) (born 1974), professional wrestler
Mike "Twin" Sullivan (1878–1937), American boxer
Michael Sullivan (soccer) (born 1995), American soccer player

Musicians
Michael Sullivan (singer-songwriter) (born 1950), Brazilian singer-songwriter
Mike Sullivan, guitarist for the band Russian Circles
Michael Sullivan, member of the band Redcar

Others
Michael Sullivan (art historian) (1916–2013), Emeritus Fellow of St Catherine's College, Oxford
Michael Sullivan (stonemason) (died 1928), American stonemason who built various historical structures in Casa Grande, Arizona
Michael J. Sullivan (author) (born 1961), author of The Riyria Revelations, VA
Michael D. Sullivan (journalist), South East Asia correspondent for National Public Radio
Michael G. Sullivan (biologist) (born 1958), Canadian wildlife biologist
Michael Sullivan (filmmaker), American film and television writer, director and producer
Michael P. Sullivan (born 1934), American attorney and former President of Dairy Queen
Mike Sullivan (pilot) (born 1970), NASA test pilot
Mike Sullivan, co-developer of XenForo

See also
Mick Sullivan (1934–2016), English rugby league footballer
Michael O'Sullivan (disambiguation)